William LeBoutillier Fauvel (January 5, 1850 – February 8, 1897) was a merchant and political figure in Quebec, Canada. He represented Bonaventure in the House of Commons of Canada from 1891 to 1897 as a Liberal member.

Biography
He was born in Percé, Canada East, the son of John Fauvel and Henriette-Marie Le Boutillier, both originally from Jersey, and was educated in Jersey. He entered the cod trade with his father and, with his older brothers, John Bertram and George Philip, took over the business when his father retired in 1879. He settled at Paspébiac. Fauvel married Emma Du Heaume in 1881. In 1886, he became interim manager for Le Boutillier Brothers on behalf of its creditors and decided to purchase the business with other partners. Fauvel served as mayor of New Carlisle and was vice-consul for Portugal at Paspébiac. He was also president of the Agricultural Society for Bonaventure. With the support of Quebec premier Honoré Mercier, Fauvel was elected in the Bonaventure riding in the 1891 federal election. Fauvel also served as campaign manager for François-Xavier Lemieux when Lemieux ran for a seat in the Quebec assembly in 1894. Fauvel was reelected in 1896 but died in office at Paspébiac the following year at the age of 47.

References 

 

1850 births
1897 deaths
Members of the House of Commons of Canada from Quebec
Liberal Party of Canada MPs
Mayors of places in Quebec